John Sokolov (born Ivan Aleksandrovich Sokolov ) was Bishop of the Russian Orthodox Church, Metropolitan of Kiev and Galicia and Exarch of Ukraine.

External links
 

1877 births
1968 deaths
People from Dmitrovsky District, Moscow Oblast
People from Dmitrovsky Uyezd (Moscow Governorate)
Bishops of the Russian Orthodox Church
First Hierarchs of the Ukrainian Orthodox Church (Moscow Patriarchate)
Burials at Baikove Cemetery